Fossum Field is a baseball park located in Aberdeen, South Dakota. It is the home to several baseball teams including Northern State University, the Aberdeen Smittys, and Presentation College. Formerly, it was the home to the Hub City Hotshots until they suspended all operations in 2019. It seats 2,500. It features a full press box, bullpens, indoor restrooms, batting cages, picnic tables, and a full sized field for practice to the north.

Renovations
The outfield fence was replaced in 2011.

A fenced in party area was added in 2018 as well as a fresh coat of paint in the concessions, dugouts, and bathrooms.

References

Baseball venues in South Dakota
College baseball venues in the United States
Northern State Wolves baseball